The Blue Diamonds were an Indonesian and Dutch 1960s rock and roll duo, best known for their million-selling chart-topping single, "Ramona". Indo (Dutch-Indonesian) brothers Ruud de Wolff (12 May 1941 – 18 December 2000) and Riem de Wolff (15 April 1943 – 12 September 2017) founded the group shortly after immigrating to Driebergen-Rijsenburg in the Netherlands in 1949. They were born in Batavia (now Jakarta), Indonesia.

Early career
Called the "Dutch – Indonesian Everly Brothers", the Blue Diamonds covered many Everly Brothers songs, but became famous in 1960 with their version of "Ramona", a song originally written for the 1928 film, Ramona. The song was written for promotional appearances with Dolores del Río (star of the film) but not featured in the film itself. The Blue Diamonds up-tempo version of it (changing it from an original  rhythm to a  one) reached the American Billboard Hot 100 at number 72 in 1960. It sold over 250,000 copies in the Netherlands (the first record to ever do so) and over one million copies in Germany by 1961.

Later career
Although their last hit was in 1971, they continued to perform together up until Ruud de Wolff died from bladder cancer at the end of the year 2000. Riem de Wolff continued to perform and release albums until his death in 2017. At the time of his death, Riem had just been diagnosed with lung and liver cancer and had been suffering from the effects of a recent stroke.

References

External links

 Fan site

Doo-wop groups
Dutch musical duos
Dutch-based Indonesian musical duos
Dutch people of Indonesian descent
Indonesian musical duos
Indo people
Decca Records artists
Philips Records artists
Sibling musical duos